Negro Colleges in War Time is a short propaganda film produced by the Office of War Information in 1943. Other than in the title no reference is made to the students' race.

The film begins with a shot of the famous statue of Booker T. Washington at Tuskegee, and notes that "progress and industry" has a new meaning for the present—winning the Second World War. A brief overview of the war related work at several different black colleges follows, starting with Tuskegee where the famous George Washington Carver was putting his brain to work for the war effort. Students are encouraged to join the Tuskegee Airmen or learn about aviation manufacture.

At Prairie View College in Texas and Howard University in  Washington, DC students learn the increasingly technical skills of war industry and agriculture. At Howard's medical school, training is also being offered to supply the field with nurses. Hampton University in Virginia is "practically on a 24-hour basis training more war workers" and its radio programs on soybean research and nutrition are featured in the film.

References

External links 
 
 

1943 films
American World War II propaganda shorts
American black-and-white films
American short documentary films
1940s short documentary films
Black-and-white documentary films
1940s American films